Narada Bakmeewewa (Sinhala: නාරද බක්මීවැව) is a popular Sri Lankan Sinhala-language television presenter and actor, who made his television debut in the mid 1990s. He hosts Young Asia Television's highly rated environmental program Mhisara, and Sirasa TV's Rasa Risi Gee, giving him the unique distinction of appearing on both of Sri Lanka's most popular channels, Ruphavahini and MTV.
 
Born to an artistic family, Narada was drawn by the appeal and culture of television and media from an early age. He studied television and production at the National Youth Council, and holds a master's degree in mass communication from the University of Kelaniya. He has been with Young Asia Television since its inception.

Narada has also been involved the music industry. In addition to the chart show Rasa Risi Gee, which he co-presents, he has released an album titled Aneka.

His acting credits include a supporting role in the 2006 film Anjalika. He received critical acclaim for his portrayal of the main character's best friend.

In his spare time, he enjoys reading, writing, films, listening to music, and photography. He is also an avid traveller.

References

Facebook page https://www.facebook.com/Naradabax/

Living people
Sri Lankan television presenters
Year of birth missing (living people)